Federated Wiki (formerly Smallest Federated Wiki) is a collaborative knowledge application developed by Ward Cunningham which adds forking features found in source control systems and other software development tools to wikis. The project was launched at IndieWebCamp 2011. The software allows its users to fork wiki pages, maintaining their own copies.

Federation supports what Cunningham has described as "a chorus of voices" where users share content but maintain their individual perspectives. This approach contrasts with the tendency of centralized wikis such as Wikipedia to function as consensus engines.

See also 
 List of wiki software
 WikiWikiWeb - using Federated Wiki since 2015

References

External links 
 
 Federated Wiki – A conversation with Jeff Rimland and Ward Cunningham – a video podcast published by the Center for Online Innovation in Learning
 Missing from the Beginning: The Federation of Wiki  – presentation by Ward Cunningham at the University of Advanced Technology

2011 software
Computing platforms
Wiki software
Software using the GPL license